Niels Andersen (born 7 August 1942) is a Danish actor.

Selected filmography 
 Hannah med H  (2003)
 Tomorrow My Love (1971)

References

External links 
 

1942 births
Living people
Danish male film actors